mXparser is an open-source mathematical expressions parser/evaluator providing abilities to calculate various expressions at a run time. Expressions definitions are given as plain text, then verified in terms of grammar / syntax, finally calculated. Library source code is maintained separately for Java and C#, providing the same API for Java/JVM, Android, .NET and Mono (Common Language Specification Compliant).

Main features / usage examples
mXparser delivers functionalities such as: basic calculations, implied multiplication, built-in constants and functions, numerical calculus operations, iterated operators, user defined constants, user defined functions, user defined recursion, Unicode mathematical symbols support.

Basic operators
mXparser supports basic operators, such as: addition '+', subtraction '-', multiplication '*', division '/', factorial '!', power '^', modulo '#'.
Expression e = new Expression("2+3/(4+5)^4");
double v = e.calculate();

Implied multiplication
Expression e = new Expression("2(3+4)3");
double v = e.calculate();
Expression e = new Expression("2pi(3+4)2sin(3)e");
double v = e.calculate();

Binary relations
It is possible to combine typical expressions with binary relations (such as: greater than '>', less than '<', equality '=', inequality '<>', greater or equal '>=', lower or equal '<='), as each relation evaluation results in either '1' for true outcome, or '0' for false.
Expression e = new Expression("(2<3)+5");
double v = e.calculate();

Boolean logic
Boolean logic also operates assuming equivalence of '1 as true' and '0 as false'. Supported Boolean operators include: AND conjunction , OR disjunction, NAND Sheffer stroke, NOR, XOR Exclusive OR, IMP Implication, CIMP Converse implication, NIMP Material nonimplication, CNIMP Converse nonimplication, EQV Logical biconditional, Negation.
Expression e = new Expression("1 --> 0");
double v = e.calculate();

Built-in mathematical functions
Supported common mathematical functions (unary, binary and variable number of arguments), including: trigonometric functions, inverse trigonometric functions, logarithm functions, exponential function, hyperbolic functions, Inverse hyperbolic functions, Bell numbers, Lucas numbers, Stirling numbers, prime-counting function, exponential integral function, logarithmic integral function, offset logarithmic integral , binomial coefficient and others.

Expression e = new Expression("sin(0)+ln(2)+log(3,9)");
double v = e.calculate();
Expression e = new Expression("min(1,2,3,4)+gcd(1000,100,10)");
double v = e.calculate();
Expression e = new Expression("if(2<1, 3, 4)");
double v = e.calculate();
Expression e = new Expression("iff(2<1, 1; 3<4, 2; 10<2, 3; 5<10, 4)");
double v = e.calculate();

Built-in math constants
Built-in mathematical constants, with high precision.
Expression e = new Expression("sin(pi)+ln(e)");
double v = e.calculate();

Iterated operators
Iterated summation and product operators.
Expression e = new Expression("sum(i, 1, 10, ln(i))");
double v = e.calculate();
Expression e = new Expression("prod(i, 1, 10, sin(i))");
double v = e.calculate();

Numerical differentiation and integration
mXparser delivers implementation of the following calculus operations: differentiation and integration.
Expression e = new Expression("der( sin(x), x )");
double v = e.calculate();
Expression e = new Expression("int( sqrt(1-x^2), x, -1, 1)");
double v = e.calculate();

Prime numbers support
Expression e = new Expression("ispr(21)");
double v = e.calculate();
Expression e = new Expression("Pi(1000)");
double v = e.calculate();

Unicode mathematical symbols support
Expression e = new Expression("√2");
double v = e.calculate();
Expression e = new Expression("∜16 + ∛27 + √16");
double v = e.calculate();
Expression e = new Expression("∑(i, 1, 5, i^2)");
double v = e.calculate();

Elements defined by user
Library provides API for creation of user-defined objects, such as: constants, arguments, functions.

User-defined constants
Constant t = new Constant("t = 2*pi");
Expression e = new Expression("sin(t)", t);
double v = e.calculate();

User-defined arguments
Argument x = new Argument("x = 5");
Argument y = new Argument("y = 2*x", x);
Expression e = new Expression("sin(x)+y", x, y);
double v = e.calculate();

User-defined functions
Function f = new Function("f(x, y) = sin(x)+cos(y)");
Expression e = new Expression("f(1,2)", f);
double v = e.calculate();

User-defined variadic functions
Function f = new Function("f(...) = sum( i, 1, [npar], par(i) )");
Expression e = new Expression("f(1,2,3,4)", f);
double v = e.calculate();

User-defined recursion
Function fib = new Function("fib(n) = iff( n>1, fib(n-1)+fib(n-2); n=1, 1; n=0, 0 ) )");
Expression e = new Expression("fib(10)", fib);   
double v = e.calculate();

Requirements
 Java: JDK 1.5 or higher
 .NET/Mono: framework 2.0 or higher

Documentation
 Tutorial
 Javadoc API specification

mXparser - source code
Source code is maintained and shared on GitHub.

See also
 List of numerical libraries
 List of numerical analysis software
 Mathematical software
 Exp4j

References

External links
 MathParser.org
 mXparser on NuGet
 mXparser on Apache Maven
 Scalar powered by mXparser
 ScalarMath.org powered by mXparser

Free mathematics software
Parsing
2010 software
Free software programmed in Java (programming language)
Free software programmed in C Sharp
Software using the BSD license
Free mobile software
Software that uses Mono (software)
Free and open-source Android software
.NET Framework software
Computer algebra systems